Nora Rubashova (12 March 1909 – 12 May 1987) was a Catholic nun converted from Judaism. Her monastic name was Catherine.

Biography
Nora Rubashova was born in Minsk, Belarus, in a wealthy Jewish family. In April 1926, under the influence of her high school teacher Tamara Sapozhnikova, she converted to Catholicism, later was tonsured a nun by the name of Catherine of Siena. She studied at the Faculty of History and Philology of Moscow State University.  Rubashova was a parishioner of Sergei Solovyov (Catholic priest).  On February 15, 1931 she was arrested for belonging to Russian Catholic Church.  On August 18, 1931 she was sentenced to 5 years of labor camps in the Mariinsky District, was released in 1936 and sent into exile in Michurinsk.  In 1937 she left for Maloyaroslavets, where she joined the sisters, the remains of Anna Abrikosova's Dominican community.  In May 1944 Rubashova traveled to the New Shulba near Semipalatinsk, to help sister Stephanie Gorodets who was there in exile.  In 1947, together with sister Stephanie she returned to Maloyaroslavets, and in summer of 1948 moved to Kaluga.  On November 30, 1948 she was re-arrested for belonging to Russian Catholics and on October 29, 1949 was sentenced to 15 years of labor camps. Rubashova was sent to Vorkuta Gulag and in 1954 to Karlag, staying there until May 1956. After her release from the labour camp, Rubashova went to Moscow. Stephanie Gorodets soon joined her and they lived together in a small room in the communal apartment near metro station "Universitet". Nora Rubashova got a job at the Historical Library, where she worked until retirement. She attended the Church of Saint Louis, and later around her united the congregation of the old community of Russian Catholics, her room became a meeting place for the sisters and the spiritual center of the new community, where later appeared younger people and students. The community arranged clandestine Masses which beginning from October 1979 were celebrated by a Catholic priest from Leningrad, George Friedman. 

Sources
" I. Osipova 1996. S. 195; I. Osipova 1999. S. 337, the investigative case SM Soloviev et al. 1931 / / TSAFSBRF; Investigation case AB Ott et al. / / CA FSB RF, Sokolovsky DC S. 174.

References 

Converts to Eastern Catholicism from Judaism
Russian Eastern Catholics
Russian Jews
1909 births
1987 deaths
Eastern Catholic Dominican nuns
20th-century Eastern Catholic nuns
People from Minsk